Edmond Atalla (born 17 July 1960) is an Australian politician and professional engineer. A member of the Labor Party, Atalla has represented Mount Druitt in the New South Wales Legislative Assembly since 2015. The child of Coptic Egyptian parents, Atalla is known for his advocacy for members of Australia's Coptic community.

Early life and education 
Atalla was born in Port Sudan, Sudan on 17 July 1960 to Coptic Egyptian parents. Atalla and his family migrated to Australia, arriving on Anzac Day. The family settled in Prospect, New South Wales in 1970, where Atalla attended the local public school. Atalla went on to attend Grantham High School in Seven Hills. As a child, Atalla and his family attended the Coptic Orthodox Church in Redfern. 

After finishing high school, Atalla was accepted to study a Bachelor of Engineering degree (Honours) at the University of Wollongong, where he graduated in 1988. During his time at the University of Wollongong, Atalla gained employment as a junior engineer with Holroyd Municipal Council before he moved to the Mount Druitt Electorate in 1987.

Career 
In 1989, Atalla was hired as the NSW State Project Engineer for CSR Readymix, where he later gained a Builder's Licence. In 1993, Atalla moved back to the Local Government and worked as an engineer for the Liverpool City Council and was then promoted to Building Services Manager for the citywide services in 1997, and again in 2000 to Corporate Manager of Operations (head of the Engineering Operations department).

In 2005, Atalla became the National Building Systems Manager, a senior position with AVJennings where he was responsible for organisations management. In August 2014, Atalla left private and public engineering to pursue a career in politics when he was preselected to be the NSW Labor Candidate for Mount Druitt.

Political career

Early political career 
Atalla credits his interest into politics when he witnessed first hand the struggles of community members. This defining moment occurred in 1987 when he assisted an elderly man who could not afford to replace his set of dentures after they fell down a Council storm-water drain. Atalla was able to retrieve the dentures, however the man's inability to afford another set "struck a chord", and Atalla resolved to help ensure that all people would have better access to basic necessities.

Atalla joined the Labor Party 2 years later, in 1989 and states he was "attracted to the principals of Social Justice including access to health and education, employment opportunities, and greater equality in wealth and power". From 2002 to 2007, Atalla was elected as the Vice President and from 2007 to 2015 he acted as Secretary/Treasurer of the Rooty Hill Branch of the Labor Party.

In 2004, he was elected to Blacktown City Council, and in 2006 and 2007, held the position as Deputy Mayor. Within his time at the Blacktown City Council; Atalla held the following positions;

 Delegate – Floodplain Management Authorities of NSW (2004–2008)
 Chairperson – Planning and Development Committee (2008–2012)
 Chairperson – Historical Committee (2008–2012)
 Vice-President – Western Sydney Regional Organisation of Councils (WSROC)(2009–2010)

New South Wales Parliament 
In 2015, Atalla won the Mount Druitt seat in the New South Wales Parliament by a landslide, with a total of 65.4% if the vote against the NSW Liberal Party candidate Olivia Lloyd. During this time he served on the  Legislative Assembly Committee on Law and Safety. In 2019, Atalla again won the Mount Druitt seat in the NSW Parliament and experienced a positive swing, by gaining 66.4% of the vote. In 2019, Atalla supported Chris Minns' campaign to serve as leader of NSW Labor, which reportedly put him into conflict with fellow Labor MLA Marjorie O'Neill.

In office, Atalla publicly opposed plans to demolish the Coptic Church's historic church at Sydenham. In 2017, Atalla attended a ceremony hosted by Pope Tawadros II to commemorate the construction of a new Coptic Church in Kellyville. Atalla criticized fellow Sudanese-Australian Yassmin Abdel-Magied over her comments on Anzac Day in 2017.

References

 

1960 births
Living people
Australian Labor Party members of the Parliament of New South Wales
Members of the New South Wales Legislative Assembly
Australian Labor Party councillors
Deputy mayors of places in Australia
Australian civil engineers
University of Wollongong alumni
Australian people of Egyptian descent
Sudanese emigrants to Australia
Sudanese people of Egyptian descent
21st-century Australian politicians
Egyptian Australian
Arab Australian
Coptic Australian
Coptic people